Boys Don't Cry is a 1987 hit single for Yugoslav Italo disco duo Moulin Rouge, led by songwriter Matjaž Kosi.

Track listing

Wink version

Released by Polystar Records on 16 March 1989, it was their fourth single, with Japanese lyrics written by Neko Oikawa. The B-side is "Only Lonely", a Japanese-language cover of The Dooleys' 1980 single "Body Language".

The single became Wink's second No. 1 on Oricon's singles chart. It sold over 523,000 copies and was certified Platinum by the RIAJ.

Track listing
All lyrics are written by Neko Oikawa; all music is arranged by Motoki Funayama.

Chart positions 
Weekly charts

Year-end charts

Certifications

References

External links 
Moulin Rouge version
 

Wink version
 
 

1987 singles
1989 singles
1987 songs
Wink (duo) songs
Japanese-language songs
Songs with lyrics by Neko Oikawa
Oricon Weekly number-one singles

ja:涙をみせないで 〜Boys Don't Cry〜
fr:Namida wo Misenaide (Boys Don't Cry)